Erik Swoope (born May 8, 1992) is an American football tight end who is currently a free agent. He played college basketball at the University of Miami. Despite never having played organized football, he was signed by the Indianapolis Colts as an undrafted free agent after the 2014 NFL Draft.

High school career
Swoope attended Harvard-Westlake High School and played on the basketball team. As a senior, he averaged 21.8 points, 8.9 rebounds, 1.6 assists, and 1.5 blocks per game, as well as 2.8 steals as well as 71% free throw percentage. He recorded 16 games of 20-or-more points, including eight with 30-or-more points. He scored 10-or-more points in all but two games that season. He also recorded 12 double-doubles, including one 30-point, 21-rebound game. He recorded a season high 40 points on 14-17 shooting, including shooting 12-of-13 free throws.

He was also named the Mission League Most Valuable Player (MVP). The Los Angeles Daily News called him the "most dominant boys' basketball player" in the San Fernando Valley. He was rated the 41st overall power forward by ESPN.

College career

Swoope attended the University of Miami, where he majored in economics.

As a freshman during the 2010–11 season, he appeared in 29 games (nine starts) as a true freshman. He averaged 1.4 points and one rebound in 6.5 minutes per game. He was named to the 2011 ACC All-Academic Basketball team. As a sophomore in the 2011–12 season, he appeared in 23 games (eight starts). He averaged 2.3 points and 1.7 rebounds in 11.7 minutes per game, while shooting 50% (23-of-46) from the field and 47.1% free throw percentage.

As a junior during the 2012–13 season, he appeared in 27 games. He averaged 1.6 points and 1.2 rebounds per game, while shooting 18-of-28 (64.3%) from the field. As a senior in the 2013–14 season, he appeared in 31 games (10 starts). He averaged five points, 2.7 rebounds, 0.5 assists, 0.4 steals, 0.4 blocks and 18.4 minutes per game.

For his career, he appeared in 110 games (27 starts). He averaged 2.6 points, 1.7 rebounds, 0.3 steals, 0.3 assists, 0.3 blocks in 10.8 minutes per game.

College statistics

|-
| style="text-align:left;"|2010–11
| style="text-align:left;"|Miami
| 29 || 9 || 6.5 || .440 || .000 || .600 || 1.0 || .1 || style="background:#cfecec;"|.4 || .06 || 1.4
|-
| style="text-align:left;"|2011–12
| style="text-align:left;"|Miami
| 23 || 8 || 11.7 || .500 || .000 || .471 || 1.7 || .3 || style="background:#cfecec;"|.4 || .4 || 2.3
|-
| style="text-align:left;"|2012–13
| style="text-align:left;"|Miami
| 27 || 0 || 6.0 || style="background:#cfecec;"|.643 || style="background:#cfecec;"|1.000 || .316 || 1.2 || .1 || .1 || style="background:#cfecec;"|.07 || 1.6
|-
| style="text-align:left;"|2013–14
| style="text-align:left;"|Miami
| 31 || 10 || style="background:#cfecec;"|18.4 || .514 || .143 || style="background:#cfecec;"|.672 || style="background:#cfecec;"|2.7 || style="background:#cfecec;"|.5 || 0.3 || .3 || style="background:#cfecec;"|5.0
|- class="sortbottom"
| style="text-align:center;" colspan="2"|Career
| 110 || 27 || 10.8 || .519 || .200 || .577 || 1.7 || .3 || .3 || .2 || 2.6

Professional career

Indianapolis Colts
After going undrafted in the 2014 NFL Draft, Swoope signed with the Indianapolis Colts on May 11, 2014. and was waived on August 30. The Colts then signed Swoope to their practice squad on September 1, and on January 19, 2015, he signed a reserve/future contract to remain with the Colts. Swoope was waived by the Colts on September 5, and signed to the practice squad the next day. On December 30, 2015, Swoope was elevated to the active roster for the first time, after Dwayne Allen was placed on injured reserve.

Swoope started his first career game against the Denver Broncos during Week 2 of the 2016 season. Swoope caught his first career touchdown in a 34–6 win over the Minnesota Vikings in Week 15.

On September 4, 2017, Swoope was placed on injured reserve after undergoing minor knee surgery in August 2017.

On September 13, 2018, Swoope was waived by the Colts and was signed to the practice squad the next day. He was promoted back to the active roster on September 22, 2018. He was waived again on September 28, 2018 and re-signed to the practice squad. He was promoted back to the active roster on October 3, 2018. One day later, he scored his first touchdown since the 2016 season against the New England Patriots in a 38–24 loss on Thursday Night Football. On December 11, 2018, Swoope was waived by the Colts.

New Orleans Saints
On December 12, 2018, Swoope was claimed off waivers by the New Orleans Saints, only to be waived the next day after failing his physical.

Indianapolis Colts (second stint)
On December 26, 2018, Swoope was signed to the Indianapolis Colts practice squad.

Oakland Raiders
On May 21, 2019, Swoope signed with the Oakland Raiders. He was waived on July 30, 2019.

San Francisco 49ers 
Swoope had a tryout with the San Francisco 49ers on August 23, 2020, and signed with the team two days later. He was waived on August 29.

Career statistics

Personal life
Swoope is the son of Denise and Gerald Swoope. He has a brother named Devin Swoope.

References

External links
 Miami Hurricanes men's basketball bio
 Indianapolis Colts bio

1992 births
Living people
People from Lake Elsinore, California
Players of American football from California
American men's basketball players
Basketball players from California
American football tight ends
Harvard-Westlake School alumni
Miami Hurricanes men's basketball players
Indianapolis Colts players
New Orleans Saints players
Oakland Raiders players
Power forwards (basketball)
San Francisco 49ers players
Sportspeople from Riverside County, California